Danko Grlić (18 September 1923 – 1 March 1984) was a Marxist humanist, and  a member of the Praxis school of  SFR Yugoslavia.

He was born in Gračanica, Bosnia and Herzegovina. He moved to Zagreb with his family in 1931. During the Second World War he joined the anti-fascist struggle. He appreciated freedom above all, so due to his liberal expression, he often came to conflict with the government, which ended very badly for him. Because he opposed the resolution of Cominform, he was sentenced to three months in the  prison camp Goli otok in  1948.  Grlic did not accept the resolution, but for one part he held that it was correct, - where it says  there is not enough democracy in the Yugoslav Communist Party. Upon returning from Goli otok he accepted a number of minor jobs; he translated, wrote, even under a false name. A story is still circulating, that he wrote an essay for Franjo Tudjman's book "The war against war". He was paid a fee by Tudjman, but  is not cited as the author, although being acknowledged at the end of the book.

From 1950 to 1955 Grlić studied philosophy at the University of Zagreb. In 1959 he accepted  Miroslav Krleža's offer to work at the Yugoslavian Lexicographic Agency. In 1965 he was one of the founding members of the Praxis journal.
From 1966 to 1968 Grlić was president of the Croatian Philosophical Society. In 1969 he earned the PhD degree with his work “The Founding Thought of Friedrich Nietzsche”.

Grlić started his academic career in 1962 teaching aesthetics at the Academy of Arts in Zagreb. He taught there until 1968, when he was forbidden to teach at this institution. He continued his academic career in 1971, when he was elected for professor at the University of Belgrade Faculty of Philosophy,  and in 1974 he moved to the Faculty of Philosophy in Zagreb, where he was head of the department of aesthetics until his death in 1984.

His Selected Works in four volumes were published in 1988, and in 1989 a collection of articles in his honour were published in Zagreb, titled The Art and the Revolution.

He was married to Eva Grlić with whom he had a son Rajko Grlić, Croatian film director and producer.

Major works
Grlić represented critical Marxist positions typical for the whole Praxis school. After Marx, Grlić's favourite author was Friedrich Nietzsche. He wanted to overcome the negative image of Nietzsche in Marxist cycles, claiming that the Nazi’s version of Nietzsche's thoughts wasn't the essence of his thought.

The major field of scientific interest of Grlić was aesthetics. He is author of the  four-volume Study of aesthetics, published in the period of 1974–1979.

Other works included:
Dictionary of Philosophers (1968)
Contra Dogmaticos (1971)
Friedrich Nietzsche (1981)
The Challenge of the Negative: to the aesthetics of Theodor Adorno (1986, posthumous)

References

External links
Practice and Dogma - a 1965 Praxis article of Grlić
Danko Grlić Archive 
Eight Theses for Being Active Today, an article of Grlić 

1923 births
1984 deaths
Marxist theorists
Marxist humanists
Faculty of Humanities and Social Sciences, University of Zagreb alumni
Academic staff of the University of Zagreb
Academic staff of the University of Belgrade
Burials at Mirogoj Cemetery
20th-century Croatian philosophers
Yugoslav humanists